The Philippines first sent athletes to the Southeast Asian Games in 1977. Prior to 1977, the Southeast Asian Games were known as the Southeast Asian Peninsular Games. The country has hosted the games four times; in 1981, 1991, 2005, and 2019. The country's best finish at the games happened twice, both of them which they hosted: in 2005 finishing as overall champions of the games with Thailand and Vietnam finishing second and third in the overall medal standings. and in 2019 in which they beat their own 2005 medal record. Their best finish in the games, excluding editions hosted by the Philippines, was at the 1983 edition where they finish second behind Indonesia.

Southeast Asian Games

All-time medal tally 
The country ranks 5th in the all-time Medal Tally of the Southeast Asian Games and the 4th in the region to have hit 1,000-mark in the 3 tiers of medals.

Medals by sport

ASEAN Para Games

All-time medal tally 
Ranking is based on total gold medals earned.

ASEAN University Games

All-time medal tally 
Ranking is based on total gold medals earned.

ASEAN School Games

All-time medal tally 
Ranking is based on total gold medals earned.

See also 

 Thailand at the Southeast Asian Games
 Indonesia at the Southeast Asian Games
 Vietnam at the Southeast Asian Games
 Cambodia at the Southeast Asian Games
 East Timor at the Southeast Asian Games

References